Rupali Ganguly (born 5 April 1977) is an Indian actress.
Born to film director Anil Ganguly, Ganguly started her acting career as a child, making her debut at age seven in her father's film Saaheb (1985). Following appearances in less favourably received films; Angaara (1996), and Do Ankhen Barah Hath (1997), as a teenager, Ganguly had her career breakthrough, after venturing into television with her portrayal of medical intern Dr. Simran Chopra in the Star Plus medical drama series Sanjivani (2002). She received further recognition with her portrayal of Monisha (née Manisha) Singh Sarabhai in the cult sitcom Sarabhai vs Sarabhai (2004). 

Ganguly continued to appear in numerous successful television series, notably Baa Bahoo Aur Baby (2005), and Parvarrish – Kuchh Khattee Kuchh Meethi (2011), following which she took a sabbatical from acting. After a seven-year hiatus, she returned in 2020 with the soap opera Anupamaa.

Early life and education 
Ganguly was born on 5 April 1977 in Calcutta, (present-day Kolkata), West Bengal into a Bengali Hindu family. Her father, Anil Ganguly, was a director and screenwriter and her brother Vijay Ganguly is an actor-producer. She studied hotel management and theatre.

Career
Ganguly made her acting debut at age seven with her father's film Saaheb in 1985. She made her television debut in Sukanya in 2000, and has also appeared in Sanjivani and Bhabhi. Ganguly received widespread recognition and critical acclaim for her portrayal of Monisha Sarabhai, a middle-class young woman married in a high society, Cuffe Parade-living socialite family in the cult sitcom Sarabhai vs Sarabhai from 2004 to 2006.

In 2009, she participated in Colors TV's stunt based reality show, Fear Factor: Khatron Ke Khiladi 2. She also gave voice over in an animation film Dashavatar in 2008. In 2000, she established an advertising agency in Mumbai.

Since 2020, she is portraying the titular character in StarPlus's Anupamaa. Ganguly made her digital debut in 2022 with her ongoing show Anupamaa's prequel web series named Anupama: Namaste America which premiered on Disney+ Hotstar in 2022.

Personal life 
Ganguly married businessman Ashwin K. Verma on 6 February 2013. The couple has a son.

Filmography

Films

Television

Web series

Awards and nominations

References

External links 

 
 
 

Indian television actresses
Bengali television actresses
Indian stage actresses
Indian film actresses
Living people
Actresses from Kolkata
Participants in Indian reality television series
Indian women television presenters
Indian television presenters
Indian soap opera actresses
1977 births
21st-century Indian actresses
Fear Factor: Khatron Ke Khiladi participants
Bigg Boss (Hindi TV series) contestants
Actresses from Mumbai